Mark Toshiro Uyeda is an American attorney and government official. A member of the Republican Party, Uyeda has served as a member of the U.S. Securities and Exchange Commission (SEC) since June 30, 2022. He is the first Asian American to serve on the SEC.

Early life and education 
Uyeda was born to a Japanese American family. His grandfather Mac Yukihiro, ran the family business, Yukihiro Produce, in Westminster, California. Uyeda stated his grandfather and mother were interned due to Executive Order 9066, which forced him to rebuild his business.

Uyeda graduated from Georgetown University with a bachelor of science degree in business administration in 1992. He later received his Juris Doctor degree from the Duke University School of Law. As a law student, Uyeda was the notes editor for the Duke Law Journal.

Legal career 
From 1995 to 1996, Uyeda worked as an associate at K&L Gates. He later became an associate at O'Melveny & Myers in Los Angeles, where he worked from 1997 to 2004. From 2004 to 2006, he served as a senior advisor to the commissioner of the California Department of Corporations. 

In 2006, he became an attorney and advisor at the U.S. Securities and Exchange Commission (SEC). Prior to serving as a commissioner, Uyeda was a staffer for SEC commissioner Michael Piwowar and worked for SEC chair Jay Clayton. He has also worked on detail as a Republican staffer for the United States Senate Committee on Banking, Housing, and Urban Affairs.

Commissioner of the U.S. Securities and Exchange Commission (SEC) 
In April 2022, President Joe Biden nominated Uyeda to fill a vacant seat on the SEC left formerly held by Elad Roisman. His nomination was supported by Senator Pat Toomey (R-PA), who signed a letter of recommendation in his favor. 

On June 16, 2022, both Uyeda and Democratic SEC nominee Jaime Lizárraga were confirmed by the U.S. Senate. Alongside Hester Peirce, Uyeda is one of two Republicans on the five member body. Uyeda's confirmation made him the first Asian American to serve as an SEC commissioner.  Since taking office, Uyeda has expressed concerns about the viability of thirty-day comment periods.

References 

Living people
McDonough School of Business alumni
Duke University School of Law alumni
American lawyers
U.S. Securities and Exchange Commission personnel
Year of birth missing (living people)
American politicians of Japanese descent
Asian conservatism in the United States
American people of Japanese descent
Biden administration personnel